Rassilon is a fictional character in the British science fiction television series Doctor Who. In the backstory of the programme, he was the founder of Time Lord society on the planet Gallifrey and its first leader, as Lord High President.  After the original television series ended in 1989, Rassilon's character and history were developed in books and other media.

Character history
Within the universe of the television series, there are many contradictory legends about Rassilon. It is known that he developed the technology for time travel that made his people lords of time in the distant past together with his colleague Omega. Omega, a stellar engineer, was presumed killed by the supernova that created the black hole later known as the Eye of Harmony, and Rassilon harnessed the nucleus of the black hole to provide the energy that powers time travel. Rassilon then took control of Gallifrey and became the first and, to date, only Lord High President, his successors taking the title Lord President. The official history is that he was a benevolent ruler who ruled his people wisely. However, there are other accounts which paint Rassilon as a cruel dictator,  opportunistic and ambitious who seized power in the wake of his friend's death (for which some suggest he may have been deliberately responsible), and ready to take drastic measures to protect his people, nearly destroying all of time once.

Rassilon's contributions to Time Lord culture and society were immense, and his name both reverberates and is honoured throughout Time Lord history. The Rassilon Imprimatur is the name given to the symbiotic nucleus of Time Lords' cell structures that allows them to withstand the molecular stresses of time travel and grants them a link to their TARDIS time machines.

Several other Time Lord artifacts named after him have a technological function, in addition to their ceremonial roles:
 The Sash of Rassilon allows the wearer to be in close proximity to the singularity that is the Eye of Harmony, providing protection from the Eye's gravitational and energy forces, and preventing the wearer from being drawn across the event horizon of the captured black hole.  Use of the Sash in this way is cited as having a regenerative effect upon the wearer.
 The Crown of Rassilon (or matrix circlet) gives full access to the Matrix, providing a direct mental link to the computer network that serves as the repository of all Time Lord knowledge and their personality prints, captured at death in the Amplified Panatropic Computer (A.P.C net) that is a subsidiary part of the Matrix itself.
 The Key of Rassilon allows physical access to the Matrix, for maintenance of this 'micro-universe' repository of Time Lord knowledge. Confusingly, this is a separate artifact from the so-called Great Key of Rassilon, that provides direct tapping of the near limitless energies of the Eye of Harmony, and is cited as a vital component part of the demat gun (a weapon of mass destruction); it is also hinted that this 'key' is essential to accessing the other relative dimensions in time, in The Invasion of Time.
 The Rod of Rassilon (referred to as "the Great Key" in the Book of the Old Time in The Deadly Assassin) allows the user to physically access the containment/control apparatus of the Eye of Harmony itself, that was historically hidden beneath the Panopticon central dais.
 The Coronet of Rassilon gives the user the ability to amplify and to project their own will to dominate others, but its effects can be defeated, if recognised, by a co-ordinated resistance of many minds.
 The Harp of Rassilon is a musical key that unlocks a secret room within the High Council chambers.  This hidden compartment held the controls for the Time Scoop—a rudimentary "time corridor" technology, used presumably before time travel was perfected by Rassilon after the installation of the Eye of Harmony on Gallifrey.
 The Ring of Rassilon ostensibly grants the wearer immortality, but seemingly is keyed to Rassilon's DNA only, so that any other seizing the artifact is locked in perpetual imprisonment as a stone carving relief on Rassilon's bier.
 The Black Scrolls of Rassilon are parchment documents containing forbidden knowledge from the Dark Time, not recorded in the Matrix.

Rassilon is also given credit, variously, for TARDIS technology; the living metal and super-weapon validium; and the defensive Quantum Force Field and Transduction Barriers that protected Gallifrey. How much of this is true and how much of it is propaganda is not certain. However, it is established that a TARDIS derives its power primarily from the Eye of Harmony.

The Tomb or Tower of Rassilon, also known as the Dark Tower, stands in the middle of the Death Zone—a blasted, barren plain—on Gallifrey. The Death Zone was used, in a period of Gallifrey's history known as the Dark Time, as an arena that pitted warriors of various alien species and times (captured by the use of a device called the Time Scoop) against each other in gladiatorial games, although the Second Doctor tells the Brigadier that Rassilon put a stop to the games (The Five Doctors, 1983). It was rumoured that Rassilon, who lived during this time, had been deposed by Time Lords rebelling against his rule. It was also claimed Rassilon had discovered the secret of immortality and was still alive in the Tower, sleeping. The quest to reach Rassilon's tomb and the secret, blocked by a series of deadly obstacles, is referred to as "The Game of Rassilon".

The Five Doctors

In The Five Doctors, Lord President Borusa wants Rassilon's secret for himself, describing Rassilon's immortality as "perpetual bodily regeneration". Borusa uses the Time Scoop to transport the Doctor in the majority of his incarnations (along with various companions) to the Death Zone, using them to clear the way to the Tower.  The First Doctor deduced from the riddle "This is the Game of Rassilon; to lose is to win and he who wins shall lose" that the Game was a trap to get rid of Time Lords who might be a danger to their race.  Borusa is granted immortality by being transformed into a living statue.  Rassilon subsequently returned the first three Doctors to their proper places in time and space and freed the Fourth Doctor from the time eddy in which he had been trapped. In that story, Rassilon (played by Richard Mathews) appears as a disembodied image floating above his own sepulchre, but the nature of this apparition is not explained.

People with major involvement in the Doctor Who television series, Doctor Who spin off media and in Doctor Who Magazine, when asked in The Essential Doctor Who magazine, were divided over whether the image of Rassilon seen in The Five Doctors is actually alive or an artificial intelligence or if he had ever died prior to The Five Doctors. According to DWM editor Tom Spilsbury, it hadn't occurred to him before that he was anything other than being alive, and that "it might come down to semantics over what being alive means". Doctor Who scriptwriter Gareth Roberts believed that Rassilon is dead and the face that appears is "a clever AI". Head writer and executive producer Russell T Davies believed that Rassilon is "clearly alive", with his big face in the story being "A projection from the Matrix. A mental life extending beyond the body's death." Spin-off writer George Mann believed that Rassilon was dead, but the Time Lords had figured out a way of "resurrecting dead people in extreme circumstances", doing "something horrible and timey wimey". Spin-off writer and DWM columnist Jacqueline Rayner described his condition as "a permanent sleep which is pretty much indistinguishable from death", and that "He's immortal, but he has no awareness," and when the trap inside the Tomb of Rassilon is triggered, "he becomes semi-aware so he can oversee or judge what's going on, before going back into his eternal sleep again". DWM deputy editor Peter Ware believed that Rassilon is dead by the time of The Five Doctors, and his dead mind is speaking from the Matrix to the Doctors and Borusa. He mentions the line from the episode "Hell Bent" (2015)—"Rassilon the resurrected", as further proof that he had died. Doctor Who scriptwriter Mark Gatiss quipped that Rassilon is "biding his time until he regenerates into [actor] Daniel Craig". Head writer and executive producer Steven Moffat, who also wrote "Hell Bent", understood that Rassilon was "alive, but in 'eternal sleep'", having got up from his eternal sleep to participate in the Time War, "And got killed. And resurrected. Because that happened a lot in the Time War." According to scriptwriter Terrance Dicks, who wrote The Five Doctors, Rassilon has "gone to a higher plane where he's a benevolent being who can, if he feels it's a big enough crisis, intervene".

Revived series 
Rassilon (portrayed by Timothy Dalton) appears as the villainous mastermind of "The End of Time", the two-part finale of the series' 2009 Specials. Though referred to by name by the Tenth Doctor, Dalton is credited as the 'Narrator / Lord President' with Russell T Davies confirming his name in a Doctor Who Confidential episode.

During the Time War, Rassilon became ruthless and determined to avoid death at any cost, motivating his formulating of the "Final Sanction" which would destroy all creation while elevating himself and the Time Lords into beings of pure consciousness. The Doctor in his War Doctor incarnation learned of this and decided to end the war using the Gallifreyan superweapon called "the Moment". With the prophecy deciphered that the Doctor would destroy Gallifrey to end the Time War, and told he would die on that day, Rassilon refuses to accept his fate and killed his advisor for speaking out against his plans.

Anticipating Gallifrey's complete annihilation in "The End of Time" (2009–10), Rassilon attempted to break the planet out of the Time Lock implemented in the latter phases of the Time War to block creative attacks involving time travel, placing a drumbeat (actually the heartbeat of Gallifreyian twin-hearts) in the mind of the Master when he was a child. As a result, Rassilon is the cause of the Master's insanity and indirectly responsible for the Time Lord's actions. When the Master turned all of humanity into copies of himself, the now-amplified drum beat acts as a signal that, with a White Point Star diamond (a diamond unique to the planet, Gallifrey), allows Rassilon and Gallifrey to escape the Time Lock. Destroying the White Point Star, the Doctor severs the link between Gallifrey and Earth. Rassilon's attempts to kill the Doctor in revenge are blocked by the Master, vengeful owing to his manipulation by Rassilon, who then follows him and the other Time Lords into the last day of the Time War.

In "The Day of the Doctor" (2013), the Time Lords are revealed not to have been destroyed at the Time War's conclusion; all incarnations of the Doctor united and used their TARDISes to send Gallifrey into a pocket dimension. In "Hell Bent" (2015), the Twelfth Doctor arrives on Gallifrey and learns that a regenerated Rassilon was responsible for his imprisonment and torture for four and a half billion years, as well as indirectly responsible for the death of his companion, Clara. On arriving on Gallifrey, he leads a military revolt against Rassilon, deposes him, and sends him into exile. Timothy Dalton was asked to reprise the role for the episode, but was replaced by Donald Sumpter as a regenerated Rassilon when he became unavailable for filming.

Other appearances
Rassilon's rise to power was explored in the Virgin New Adventures novel Cat's Cradle: Time's Crucible. It is revealed in the novel that Ancient Gallifrey was ruled by the Pythia, who controlled the population through prophecies and superstition. Rassilon, whose followers believed in science and rationality, led a revolution against the Pythia, eventually causing her to kill herself, and send her followers to the planet Karn. However, before she died she cursed Rassilon and all future Time Lords to sterility. Rassilon's unborn daughter was one of the deaths. In later New Adventures we are introduced to the concept of the genetic Looms, from which new Time Lords were created. This leads to Rassilon becoming part of a ruling triumvirate with Omega and a mysterious figure called the Other. Together they rebuilt Gallifrey and re-ordered the universe along rational and scientific lines, outlawing superstition and banishing magic. The later novel Lungbarrow shows Rassilon becoming increasingly tyrannical and violently crushing resistance to his reforms, which ultimately leads to the Other breaking with him and throwing himself into the genetic looms, leading to his later apparent reincarnation as the Doctor.

In the last three stories of Alan Moore's run on Doctor Who Monthly we see the first Time War in Time Lord history, where the Order of the Black Sun make a pre-emptive strike on the Gallifreyans' experiments with time travel. In the first story, "Star Death" (Doctor Who Magazine #47), we see Rassilon gaining the equipment to control time travel thanks to the failed initial attack. In the DWM comic strips, Rassilon is shown existing in the Matrix as part of a council of "Higher Evolutionaries" acting as the guardians of Time (The Tides of Time Part 2, DWM #62, among others).

In the Doctor Who audio plays produced by Big Finish Productions, Rassilon is voiced by Don Warrington. He is shown to continue to exist in the Matrix. According to audio plays, Rassilon developed the power of regeneration from the Vampires, who were apparently peaceful until the Time Lords attacked them. He transforms the Doctor into his assassin—a being of pure anti-time that identifies itself as Zagreus—to defeat the Divergents, a race who would have evolved to surpass the Time Lords if reality had progressed as it should have, only for his plans to fail when the Doctor proclaims that he does not kill and Zagreus refuses to be Rassilon's puppet.

At the end of Zagreus, the Doctor is exiled to the Divergents' universe, having previously cast Rassilon into that reality to end his actions but unable to return to his universe as he was still contaminated by anti-time. He eventually tracks down Rassilon in that universe, and discovers that he has been manipulating an entity called the Kro'Ka to observe and control the Doctor and Charley's actions. At the end of the events of "The Next Life", the Doctor and his companions escape the timeless Divergent universe—Rassilon having previously filtered the Zagreus energies out of the Doctor upon his arrival in this universe without the Doctor's knowledge—but Rassilon and the Kro'Ka remain trapped in a permanent loop.

Rassilon's next audio appearance comes in Desperate Measures, concluding the ninth series of Big Finish Productions spin-off Gallifrey. During the Time War the Time Lord Valerian (David Sibley) becomes a host through whom Rassilon is resurrected to lead Gallifrey. These events will lead into the tenth series of the spin-off where the part will be played by Terrence Hardiman. This season ends with Romana attempting to arrange an assassination to stop his dictatorship, ending with Rassilon beginning to regenerate. The series ends on a cliffhanger as he uses his regeneration as a propaganda opportunity.

In Doctor Who: The Adventure Games, Rassilon's Final Sanction is mentioned when Amy Pond looked at a Time Lord Staff that the Eleventh Doctor kept in his study.

Rassilon features in the War Doctor novel Engines of War by George Mann, which looks at the events that led to the War Doctor's decision to use the Moment, including the discovery that Rassilon has resurrected Borusa as a possibility engine to help him decide what actions he should take during the war.

Rassilon returns to Gallifrey in the Titan Comics 2016 multi-Doctor event story Supremacy of the Cybermen, which depicts the last Cybermen at the end of the universe forming an alliance with Rassilon with the goal of conquering Gallifrey and using Time Lord energy to regenerate the universe into one under Cyber-control. Although Rassilon's insight allows the Cybermen to conquer history and defeat all of the past Doctors, the Twelfth Doctor is able to convince Rassilon to help him after the Cybermen betray Rassilon, the two turning the Cybermens' equipment against them so that the universe is 'regenerated' to a point before the Cybermen conquered Gallifrey. Although the Twelfth Doctor is the only one shown to remember these events, he is shown speculating that Rassilon may also remember the horrors of what he did.

In the subsequent Titan Comics special The Lost Dimension, the Eleventh Doctor briefly accidentally travels back to ancient Gallifrey where he assists Rassilon in a testflight of the very first Tardis.

List of appearances

Television
The Five Doctors
"The End of Time"
"Hell Bent"

Novels
Cat's Cradle: Time's Crucible
Engines of War

Comics
"Star Death" (Doctor Who Magazine #47)
Supremacy of the Cybermen (Titan Comics)
Monstrous Beauty (Doctor Who Magazine #556-558)

Audio plays
Zagreus
"The Next Life"
Desperate Measures
Havoc
'CollateralAssassinsDeceptionHomecomingThe Last Days of FremeThe Passenger''

See also
History of the Time Lords

References

External links 
 

Doctor Who audio characters
Television characters introduced in 1983
Time Lords
Male characters in television
Male villains